Granite Broadcasting LLC is a broadcasting holding company in New York City which owns one television station in the United States, in Syracuse, New York. Granite was founded by W. Don Cornwell and Stuart Beck in 1988, and was the first African-American station group in the United States considered to be a "major" station operator (though not the first minority-owned chain, a distinction held by the now-defunct Aleut-owned Cook Inlet Broadcasting).

Granite's chairman/CEO is Peter Markham, with Duane Lammers as COO.

History
W. Don Cornwell left Goldman Sachs' investment banking department in 1988. He co-founded founded Granite Broadcasting Corporation with Stuart Beck on February 8, 1988. In 1993, it purchased two stations from Meredith Corporation, which included WTVH in Syracuse and KSEE in Fresno for $38 million.

In 1997, Granite purchased TV station KOFY-TV for $143.8 million, becoming the largest purchase ever. Cornwell served as CEO and chairman of Granite until stepping down in 2009. During his time with the company, Granite expanded to 23-channels and 11 markets. In April 2006, Granite bought out WBNG-TV in Binghamton from SJL Broadcasting, which was in the process of liquidating its broadcasting holdings, which paid $45 million to cost.

Granite declared Chapter 11 (reorganization) bankruptcy on December 11, 2006, mainly due to the complications of the 2006 United States broadcast TV realignment which nullified the sales of the group's Detroit and San Francisco The WB affiliates due to those stations being left out of The CW because of CBS Corporation-owned stations in both cities taking the affiliation by default. It emerged from bankruptcy in June 2007 under the control of private equity firm Silver Point Capital (which also took over ComCorp later that year).

In 2011, it filed a lawsuit against Nexstar Broadcasting Group for having the Fox affiliation to appear on WPTA's digital subchannel after dropping it from WFFT. The suit was settled in 2013, and WFFT reclaimed the Fox affiliation.

In February 2014, Granite reached deals to sell the majority of its stations. WKBW-TV in Buffalo, New York and WMYD in Detroit were sold to the E. W. Scripps Company for $110 million (the latter forming a duopoly with Scripps-owned ABC affiliate WXYZ-TV). Most of its remaining stations (mostly in small markets), along with the Malara Broadcast Group's two stations, went to Quincy Newspapers and SagamoreHill Broadcasting (which originally planned to operate the LMA-controlled stations Granite currently provides services to for Quincy). SagamoreHill was subsequently dropped from the Quincy transaction.

In July 2015, the deal was reworked yet again to have SagamoreHill acquire WISE, the SSA between WISE and WPTA (owned by Quincy) wound down within nine months of its closure, and have all of WISE's network affiliations moved to WPTA in exchange for its The CW Plus affiliation. On September 15, 2015, the FCC approved the deal, which was completed on November 2.

Station list

Current

Former

Notes

References

External links
Company Site
Company Profile @ Forbes
List of company contacts and locations
Don Cornwell interview April 17, 2000

Television broadcasting companies of the United States
Mass media companies established in 1988
Mass media companies based in New York City
Companies that filed for Chapter 11 bankruptcy in 2006
Gray Television
2015 mergers and acquisitions